Pichdeh may refer to:
 Pichdeh, Chalus
 Pichdeh, Nur